Neo-Sovietism is the Soviet Union–style of policy decisions in some post-Soviet states, as well as a political movement of reviving the Soviet Union in the modern world or to reviving specific aspects of Soviet life based on the nostalgia for the Soviet Union. Some commentators have said that current Russian President Vladimir Putin holds many neo-Soviet views, especially concerning law and order and military strategic defense.

Neo-Sovietism in Russian state policies
According to Pamela Druckerman of The New York Times, an element of neo-Sovietism is that "the government manages civil society, political life and the media".

According to Matthew Kaminski of The Wall Street Journal, it includes efforts by Putin to express the glory of the Soviet Union in order to generate support for a "revived Great Russian power in the future" by bringing back memories of various Russian accomplishments that legitimatized Soviet dominance, including the Soviet victory against Nazi Germany. Kaminski continues on by saying that neo-Sovietism "offers up Russian jingoism stripped bare of Marxist internationalist pretenses" and uses it to scare Russia's neighbours and to generate Russian patriotism and anti-Americanism.

Andrew Meier of the Los Angeles Times in 2008 listed three points that laid out neo-Sovietism and how modern Russia resembles the Soviet Union:
Russia was a land of doublespeak. Meier claims that Russia has deliberately distorted words and facts on various subjects, particularly regarding the Russo-Georgian War at the time by claiming that the United States instigated the conflict and that Georgia was committing genocide in South Ossetia.
Russia was willing to enhance its power by any means possible, including harsh repression of its own citizens with examples being Mikhail Khodorkovsky and the Mothers of Beslan.
Russia remains a land in which "fear of the state—and its suffocating reach—prevails" by introducing numerous laws that limit free expression and promote propaganda.

Organizations
All-Union Communist Party (Bolsheviks) (1995)
All-Union Communist Party of Bolsheviks (1991)
Armenian Communist Party
Azerbaijan United Communist Party
Communist Party of the Russian Federation
Communist Party of the Soviet Union (1992)
Communist Party of the Soviet Union (2001)
Communist Party of Ukraine
Essence of Time
Russian Communist Workers' Party of the Communist Party of the Soviet Union
Union of Communist Parties – Communist Party of the Soviet Union

See also

Eurasian Economic Union
Eurasianism
Fourth Reich
National Bolshevism
Neo-Slavism
Neo-Stalinism
Nostalgia for the Soviet Union
Russian imperialism
Second Cold War
Soviet imperialism
Soviet patriotism
Union State

References

 
Nostalgia for the Soviet Union
Political movements
Political theories
Post-Soviet states
Far-left politics